Katja Kramarczyk (née Schülke) (born 18 March 1984) is a German retired  handball player for Bayer 04 Leverkusen (handball) and the German national team.

She participated at the 2011 World Women's Handball Championship in Brazil.

References

1984 births
Living people
German female handball players
Sportspeople from Frankfurt (Oder)